In Mandaeism, kushta or kušṭa can have several meanings. Its original literal meaning is "truth" in the Mandaic language, and is thus typically used to refer to the Mandaean religious concept of truth. The same word is also used to refer to a sacred handclasp that is used during Mandaean rituals such as masbuta, masiqta, and priestly initiation ceremonies.

In the World of Light
Mandaeans believe that in the World of Light, the Mšunia Kušṭa, or the world of ideal counterparts, exists, where everything has a corresponding spiritual pair (dmuta). Alternatively, kušṭa can be used as a synonym for Hayyi Rabbi, or God in Mandaeism.

In the 69th chapter of the Mandaean Book of John, Manda d-Hayyi addresses Etinṣib Ziwa (Splendid Transplant), son of Yushamin, as "Truth, beloved by all excellencies." E. S. Drower interprets a reference in the Haran Gawaita to being looked upon by and rising with Transplant upon death as a reference to Ṣauriel, the Angel of Death. Book 1, chapter 1 of the Left Ginza likewise observes that Ṣauriel is called "Death" in this world, but "Truth" (Kushta) by those who know about him.

Carl H. Kraeling interprets the concept of Kushta as having developed from an entity in the pleroma representing truth as the directive force of Hayyi's actions, alongside Manda d-Hayyi as his hypostatic reason.

In rituals
The kušṭa handclasp is exchanged dozens of times between the novice and initiator during priest initiation ceremonies. It is also exchanged during rituals that need to be performed by priests, such as masbuta and masiqta rituals.

See also
Drabsha, the symbol of Mandaeism
Secret handshake
Via et veritas et vita

References

Mandaean philosophical concepts
Mandaic words and phrases
Truth
Hand gestures
Mandaean rituals